Anthony G. Forlini (born February 4, 1962) is an American politician from Michigan. Forlini was a Republican member of the Michigan House of Representatives for the 24th district from 2011 through 2016.

Early life 
On February 4, 1962, Forlini was born in Detroit, Michigan. Forlini's father was an Italian from the town of Cassino, Italy.
Forlini grew up in St. Clair Shores. Forlini attended St. Germaine Elementary School.

Education 
In 1984, Forlini earned a degree in Business from Western Michigan University. Forlini is a Certified Financial Planner.

Career 
As a businessman, Forlini is the owner of Design Financial and President of INFINEX Investments & Design Financial, Incorporated.

In 2004, Forlini became a township supervisor in Harrison Township, Michigan, until 2011.

On November 2, 2010, Forlini won the election and became a Republican member of Michigan House of Representatives for District 24. Forlini defeated Sarah Roberts and Keith P. Edwards with 50.18% of the votes. On November 6, 2012, as an incumbent, Forlini won the election and continued serving District 24. Forlini defeated Philip Kurczewski with 54.71% of the votes.
District 24 covers Harrison Township as well as portions of Clinton Township and Macomb Township. 

In March 2016, Forlini announced that he was running for Congress in Michigan's 10th District, as Candice Miller, the then current Representative, was not running for another term.

In 2017, Forlini became an Operations Manager with Macomb County Public Works.

As of 2021, he is the current Macomb County Clerk. During his campaign, his tagline was "Every vote matters, every vote counts," ensuring that a voter's voice matters in the eyes of the United States.

Awards 
 2016 Knighted. Order of the Star of Italy. Presented by Maria Luisa Lapresa, the Consul of Italy in Detroit, Michigan.

Personal life 
Forlini's wife is Diane Forlini. They have three children and two grandchildren. Forlini's family currently live in Harrison Township, Michigan. Forlini is a Roman Catholic.

See also 
 Candice Miller (Commissioner of Macomb County Public Works)

References

External links 
 Anthony  Forlini at Ballotpedia.org
 Vote MI entry on Forlini
 Macomb Daily 11 October, 2011 entry on Forlini
 Anthony Forlini at wealthminder.com
 Nine Italian language students to travel to Italy with former State Representative, Anthony Forlini in June
 Anthony Forlini at mdoe.state.mi.us

1962 births
People from Macomb County, Michigan
Republican Party members of the Michigan House of Representatives
Western Michigan University alumni
Living people
21st-century American politicians